Kirilo I or Saint Kirilo of Serbia, was the patriarch of the Serbian Orthodox Church from 1407 to 1419.

Kirilo became head of the Serbian National Church after the death of Patriarch Danilo IV at a time when Medieval Serbia was still recovering from the Battle of Kosovo and the young despot Stefan Lazarević was facing vaiorus enemies.

According to one chronicle, Patriarch Kirilo died between 1 September 1418 and 31 August 1419, and in one prologue the date of death of Patriarch Kirilo was stated 27 December 1418.

He is venerated on 12 September.

See also
 List of Serbian saints
 List of heads of the Serbian Orthodox Church

References

Further reading
 "Serbian Patriarch Cyril", People's Encyclopedia, Zagreb, 1927

Kirilo I
15th-century Serbian people
15th-century Eastern Orthodox bishops